Tonga competed at the 2019 Pacific Games in Apia, Samoa from 7 to 20 July 2019. The country participated in 22 sports at the 2019 games.

Archery

Athletics

Badminton

Tonga qualified eight players in Badminton for the 2019 Games.

Women
 Siosaia Fonua
 Lauti Naaniumotu
 Renaey Naaniumotu
 Taniela Ngaue

Women
 Lata Isitolo
 Mele Kei
 Litea Tatafu
 Lesieli Vaeno

Basketball

5x5

Men's basketball
 TBC

Women's basketball
 TBC

3x3

Men
 TBC

Women
 TBC

Boxing

Football

Men's football

Squad
TBC

Women's football

Squad
TBC

Golf

Tonga nominated ten men and five women for the tournament in Samoa, with six and one respectively to be omitted. The men's and women's teams will each have four players participating in the 2019 games. 

Women
 Losa Fapiano
 Elina Raass
 Joyce Tuivakano
 Losetapieta Fapiano
 Etivise  Latu

Men
 Afa Vasi
 Tasisio Lolesio
 Mosese Fiefia
 Mekinoti Mausia
 Kalolo Fifita
 Viliami  Mahanga
 Alani Piukala
 David Fonua
 Moses Alipate
 Siaosi Siakumi

Judo

Lawn bowls

Netball

Outrigger canoeing

Rugby league nines

Men's rugby league
 TBC

Women's rugby league
 TBC

Rugby sevens

Men's sevens

Women's sevens

Shooting

Swimming

Table tennis

Taekwondo

Tennis

Triathlon

Volleyball

Beach volleyball

Volleyball (Indoor)

Weightlifting

References

Nations at the 2019 Pacific Games
2019